American Rickshaw, also known as American Tiger, is a 1989 action fantasy film directed by Sergio Martino under the pseudonym of Martin Dolman. An international co-production of Italy and the United States, it stars Mitch Gaylord, Daniel Greene, Victoria Prouty and Donald Pleasence.

Cast
 Mitch Gaylord as Scott Edwards
 Daniel Greene as Francis
 Victoria Prouty as Joanna Simpson
 Donald Pleasence as Reverend Mortom
 Michi Kobi as Old Madame Luna

Production
Filming took place in Miami, Florida.

Reception 
The film was covered on Episode 93 of the RedLetterMedia series Best of the Worst. It was crowned Best of the Worst by all hosts of the episode.

Home media
In 2020, a 2K restoration of the film was released on Blu-ray by Cauldron Films.

References

External links
 

1989 films
1989 action films
1989 martial arts films
1989 fantasy films
1980s fantasy action films
Italian fantasy action films
Films about witchcraft
Films shot in Miami
1980s English-language films
1980s Italian films